Edmir Bilali (born 29 August 1970) is an Albanian retired football player who spent most of his career in Germany as an attacking midfielder.

Club career
He played in Albania with Vllaznia Shkodër. He is best known for winning the Albanian Superliga Golden Boot, scoring 21 goals during the 1995-96 campaign, 5 with Tomori Berat and 16 with Laçi.

References

External sources
 

1970 births
Living people
Association football forwards
Albanian footballers
KF Vllaznia Shkodër players
KF Laçi players
FK Tomori Berat players
FC Emmendingen players
Kategoria Superiore players
Albanian expatriate footballers
Expatriate footballers in Germany
Albanian expatriate sportspeople in Germany
Freiburger FC players